The Bistrița (also called as Bistrița Aurie or Bistrița Moldoveană) is a river in the Romanian regions of Maramureș, Bukovina and Moldavia (most of its length). It is a right tributary of the river Siret. At Chetriș, near Bacău, it flows into the Siret. It flows through the counties Bistrița-Năsăud, Suceava, Neamț, and Bacău. The towns Vatra Dornei, Bicaz, Piatra Neamț, Roznov, Buhuși, and Bacău lie along the Bistrița.

The upper reach is also known as Bistrița Aurie.

The following dams have been constructed on the river Bistrița:
 Topoliceni
 Izvorul Muntelui
 Pângărați
 Vaduri
 Piatra Neamț
 Reconstrucția
 Racova
 Gârleni
 Lilieci
 Bacău

Towns and villages
The following towns and villages are situated along the river Bistrița, from source to mouth: Șesuri, Cârlibaba Nouă, Valea Stânei, Botoș, Ciocănești, Iacobeni, Argestru, Vatra Dornei, Cozănești, Ortoaia, Gheorghițeni, Rusca, Sunători, Chiril, Cojoci, Satu Mare, Crucea, Holda, Holdița, Broșteni, Lungeni, Frasin, Mădei, Pârâul Cârjei, Borca, Soci, Pârâul Pântei, Bușmei, Farcașa, Popești, Frumosu, Pârâul Fagului, Săvinești, Galu, Poiana Teiului, Topoliceni, Roșeni, Poiana Largului, Călugăreni, Bistricioara, Ceahlău, Chirițeni, Grozăvești, Buhalnița, Ruginești, Izvoru Alb, Bicaz, Capșa, Tarcău, Straja, Oanțu, Pângărați, Preluca, Vaduri, Viișoara, Agârcia, Doamna, Piatra Neamț, Văleni, Cut, Dumbrava Roșie, Brășăuți, Săvinești, Roznov, Șovoaia, Zănești, Ruseni, Podoleni, Rediu, Costișa, Frunzeni, Buhuși, Blăgești, Racova, Buda, Gura Văii, Gârlenii de Sus, Gârleni, Itești, Lilieci, Bacău, Galbeni.

Tributaries

The following rivers are tributaries to the river Bistrița (from source to mouth):

Left: Bârjaba, Vulcănescu, Mostim, Tinosu Mare, Iurescu, Bretila, Țibău, Cârlibaba, Afinetu, Valea Stânei, Andronic, Botoș, Gropăria, Oița, Brezuța, Fieru, Argestru, Chilia, Biliceni, Gheorghițeni, Rusca, Stânișoara, Călinești, Frumușana, Izvorul Arseneasa, Colbu, Arama, Chiril, Cojoci, Fieru, Pârâul Fagului, Izvorul Casei, Leșu, Holda (or Puzdra), Holdița, Cotârgași, Pietroasa, Sabasa, Fărcașa, Galu, Bolătău, Stâna, Vârlanu, Letești, Hangu, Buhalnița, Potoci, Capșa, Pângărați, Pângărăcior, Valea Mare, Cuejdiu, Frăsinel, Cracău, Câlneș, Români, Lețcana, Racova, Valea Rea.
Right: Putreda, Tomnatecu Mare, Tomnatecu Mic, Bila, Lala, Rotunda, Izvorul Șes, Zacla, Valea Rusăi, Măgura, Fundoaia, Stânișoara, Valea Bâtcii, Izvorul Gândacului, Diaca, Humor, Scoruș, Pârâul Rece, Suhărzelu Mic, Suhărzelu Mare, Tisa, Ciotina, Haju, Dorna, Neagra, Arin, Cozănești, Ortoaia, Bolătău, Rusca, Oșoiu, Sunători, Valea Lutului, Izvoru Rău, Bârnărel, Pârâul Cornului, Cicul, Bârnaru, Căboaia, Neagra Broștenilor, Borca, Stejar, Dreptul, Ruseni, Zahorna, Roșeni, Pârâul Duruitorilor, Bistricioara, Schit, Răpciunița, Țiflic, Valea Strâmtorilor, Izvorul Alb, Secu, Izvorul Muntelui, Coșușna, Bicaz, Crasnița, Crasna, Potoci, Tarcău, Oanțu, Secu Vaduri, Agârcia, Doamna, Sasca, Calul, Iapa, Nechit, Poloboc, Dragova, Buda, Trebeș.

References 

Rivers of Romania
 
Rivers of Bistrița-Năsăud County
Rivers of Suceava County
Rivers of Neamț County
Rivers of Bacău County